Margret Kratz (born 11 January 1962) is a German footballer. She played in two matches for the Germany women's national football team in 1985.

References

External links
 

1962 births
Living people
German women's footballers
Germany women's international footballers
Place of birth missing (living people)
Women's association footballers not categorized by position